The Don is a river in Brittany, northwestern France. It is a tributary of the river Vilaine.

Geography
The river Don rises near Saint-Michel-et-Chanveaux in Maine-et-Loire. The river flows west, passing through the towns of Saint-Julien-de-Vouvantes and Petit-Auverné, where the Little Don joins it. The river flows through the towns of Isse, Treffieux and Jans, where the River Cone joins it. After passing under the RN 137, it continues toward Marsac-sur-Don, Guémené-Penfao and then Massérac, where it empties into the river Vilaine at the border of Loire-Atlantique and the Ille-et-Vilaine.

Hydrology

The Don has a very irregular flow rate over the months, like other tributaries of the Vilaine.

The flow of the Don was observed and documented in a study which took place over a period of 25 years (1983-2007). The results were taken from near the Don's confluence with the Vilaine. It showed that the average annual flow rate 3.77 cubic meters per second. However, the Don has strong seasonal fluctuations in flow rates, in common with other tributaries of the Valaine, and other rivers of Brittany. The highest waters occur in winter, and are characterized by average monthly rates ranging from 5.95 to 11.7 cubic meters per second. From March, the flow decreases rapidly, to the lowest water in summer from June to mid-October. The results are clearer in the bar graph, below.

See also
 List of rivers in France

References

Rivers of France
Rivers of Pays de la Loire
Rivers of Loire-Atlantique
Rivers of Maine-et-Loire